Sharon Pierre-Louis, 27 de febrero de 1984 is an American actress. She is best known for her recurring guest role on Freeform's Switched at Birth and her series regular role as Nisha Randall in The Lying Game.

Life and career
Pierre-Louis was born and raised in south Florida to Haitian parents. Her parents had immigrated to the United States during the 1980s and she was their first child born in the United States. She has five other siblings, three of which were born in Haiti, also including an older brother who is Deaf. She became interested in acting during her sixth grade year later attending a performing arts middle/high school.

Her first major acting role was in Little Miss CEO (2008), which was a television pilot that was not picked up to series. In 2008, she had a recurring guest star role as Stacy Kingston, a lesbian character in the ABC Family drama Lincoln Heights. In 2009, she guest starred in an episode of CSI: Miami, had a small singing role in the film Fame and appeared in the short film Eckford.

In 2011, she was cast as Nisha Randall on the ABC Family series The Lying Game.

In 2012, she was cast as Little Jody in the Quentin Tarrantino film Django Unchained.

In 2014 she was cast as Iris Watkins on the ABC Family series Switched at Birth in which she uses American Sign Language on the show.

Pierre-Louis is also a trained opera singer, fluent in Haitian Creole and American Sign Language.

Filmography

Film

Television

References

External links
 
 

1980s births
Living people
21st-century American actresses
Actresses from Florida
Actresses of Haitian descent
American film actresses
American television actresses
People from West Palm Beach, Florida